Pituitary adenylate cyclase-activating polypeptide also known as PACAP is a protein that in humans is encoded by the ADCYAP1 gene. pituitary adenylate cyclase-activating polypeptide is similar to vasoactive intestinal peptide. One of its effects is to stimulate enterochromaffin-like cells. It binds to vasoactive intestinal peptide receptor and to the pituitary adenylate cyclase-activating polypeptide receptor.

Function 

This gene encodes adenylate cyclase-activating polypeptide 1. Mediated by adenylate cyclase-activating polypeptide 1 receptors, this polypeptide stimulates adenylate cyclase and subsequently increases the cAMP level in target cells. Adenylate cyclase-activating polypeptide 1 not only is a hypophysiotropic hormone (i.e. a substance that induces activity in the hypophysis), but also functions as a neurotransmitter and neuromodulator. In addition, it plays a role in paracrine and autocrine regulation of certain types of cells. This gene is composed of five exons. Exons 1 and 2 encode the 5' UTR and signal peptide, respectively; exon 4 encodes an adenylate cyclase-activating polypeptide 1-related peptide; and exon 5 encodes the mature peptide and 3' UTR. This gene encodes three different mature peptides, including two isotypes: a shorter form and a longer form.

A version of this gene has been associated with post-traumatic stress disorder (PTSD) in women (but not men). This disorder involves a maladaptive psychological response to traumatic, i.e. existence-threatening, events. Ressler et al. identified an association of a SNP in the gene coding for pituitary adenylate cyclase-activating polypeptide (PACAP), implicating this peptide and its receptor (PAC1) in PTSD.

Headache Disorders
Both isoforms of pituitary adenylate cyclase-activating polypeptide (pituitary adenylate cyclase-activating polypeptide-38 and pituitary adenylate cyclase-activating polypeptide-27) have been implicated in migraine pathogenesis. A Danish research group led by Dr. Messoud Ashina found that intravenous infusion of pituitary adenylate cyclase-activating polypeptide-38 induced migraine attacks in 58% of people with migraine, whilst the corresponding migraine induction rate was 55% for pituitary adenylate cyclase-activating polypeptide-27.  Treatments with monoclonal antibodies have been investigated to target pituitary adenylate cyclase-activating polypeptide or its receptors for the treatment of primary headache disorders. Alder BioPharmaceuticals's ALD1910, which targets the peptide, began a phase I study in October 2019. Amgen's AMG-301, which targets the PAC1 receptor, failed to show greater efficacy than placebo in phase II trials.

Interactions 

Pituitary adenylate cyclase-activating peptide has been shown to interact with secretin receptor.

See also 
 Adenylate cyclase
 Pituitary gland

References

Further reading

External links 
 
 PACAP receptor peptides

Genes on human chromosome 18